Imn or IMN may refer to:

 Imation, previous NYSE symbol
 Al Iraqiya, formerly IMN, Iraqi TV broadcaster
 "IMN", a song by Mudvayne on their album Lost and Found
 Immediate Mobilization Networks, an alleged paramilitary organization formed by Venezuelan President Hugo Chávez
 Irish Medical News, an independent newspaper for doctors and health professionals in Ireland